The Stone Sky is a 2017 science fantasy novel by American writer N. K. Jemisin. It was awarded the Hugo Award for Best Novel, the Nebula Award for Best Novel, and the Locus Award for Best Fantasy Novel in 2018. Reviews of the book upon its release were highly positive. It is the third volume in the Broken Earth series, following The Fifth Season and The Obelisk Gate, both of which also won the Hugo Award.

Setting 
As with the other books in the Broken Earth series, The Stone Sky is mostly set in a single supercontinent referred to as the Stillness by its inhabitants. Most of humanity lives in city-states referred to as "comms," and are segregated into social castes based on their usefulness to society.

The Stillness is constantly wracked by geological cataclysms, and every few hundred years an event is severe enough to touch off a global volcanic winter, referred to as a Fifth Season. Some characters, referred to as orogenes, have the ability to manipulate geological energies on a large scale, as well as magic on a smaller scale. They are a persecuted and feared minority, though it is largely due to their efforts humanity has survived the Seasons at all.

Plot 
Following the events of The Obelisk Gate, the former inhabitants of Castrima-under are moving north after damage by rival comm Rennanis has compromised the mechanisms of the geode and made it uninhabitable. Essun, who has been in a coma since opening the Obelisk Gate, awakens to find that her arm has turned to stone as a consequence of the massive magical energies of the Gate. She is nursed back to health, and finds that the Moon is approaching the closest point in its long, elliptical orbit, meaning that she has only a short time to return it to a normal orbit and end the Fifth Seasons forever.

Meanwhile, Essun's daughter Nassun is recovering from the shock of using an obelisk to kill her father by turning him to stone. Despondent and angry, she resolves to use the Obelisk Gate to cause the approaching Moon to collide with Earth and destroy both. Her Guardian, Schaffa, agrees to help her reach the only city on the other side of the planet, Corepoint; from there, the Obelisk Gate can be activated without the need for the central control obelisk that Essun used.

The comm reaches Rennanis after a costly desert crossing, where Essun learns that Nassun is planning to open the Gate as Essun did, which would almost certainly mean her death. She departs for Corepoint with a small company to intercept Nassun. Just prior to leaving, she learns she is pregnant by Lerna, the former healer from her old comm Tirimo, with whom she has started a relationship. Hoa, the stone eater who has been following her since she left Tirimo, offers to take them by transporting directly through the Earth; however, as they traverse through the center of the planet (skirting around the core), they are attacked by a rival faction of stone eaters and Lerna is killed.

Nassun and Schaffa reach the ruins of a city in the Antarctic region, from which Schaffa believes transportation is available to Corepoint. They descend into the ruins, where they find a functional transportation system linking to Corepoint directly through the center of the planet. During their transit through the core, it is revealed that the Earth is a living consciousness, furious with humanity's attempts to control it and the loss of Earth's moon, which Earth blames humanity for. The core is rich with the magical energy that forms the Earth's consciousness, and Nassun realizes this directly fuels the Guardians' abilities and longevity through an iron shard embedded in their brains.

Through flashbacks, the story of Hoa is revealed: in the distant past, human technology, which seamlessly fuses advanced biotechnology and magic, has reached its pinnacle with the creation of the Obelisk Gate, a network of obelisks designed to tap the Earth's magical essence to create an inexhaustible source of energy. To accomplish this, scientists have created a race of humans with exquisite sensitivity to magic based on the DNA of a race of people the now-dominant culture defeated and subjugated. These "tuners" will control the Gate and tap the magic from Earth's core. However, the night before the Gate is to be activated, the tuners discover the fate of the people their genetic code was based on: they are kept alive as batteries, wired to the obelisks to charge them with magical energy, in eternal torment. The lead tuner, Hoa, decides to turn the Gate's energies back onto the city of Syl Anagist, destroying it rather than perpetuating this injustice. As he and his fellow tuners attempt to do so, the Earth itself takes control of the obelisks and tries to use them to melt the crust of the Earth, which will sterilize it of almost all life. Hoa and the other tuners manage to avert this catastrophe by preventing some of the obelisks from activating, at the expense of their physical bodies: they are all transformed into the first stone eaters, and the Moon is flung into a high elliptical orbit by the massive energies involved. Nevertheless, enough of the obelisks are activated to cause worldwide devastation and plunge humanity into a dark age, wracked by the Fifth Seasons. This is also known as "The Shattering".

In the present day, at Corepoint, the Earth removes its iron shard from Schaffa's brain, dooming him to an early death in a bid to prevent Nassun from destroying the world outright with the Moon. Distraught, Nassun decides to save his life by using the Gate to transform everyone on Earth into undying stone eaters. Essun arrives and attempts to seize control of the Gate using the central control obelisk in order to return the Moon to orbit, end the Seasons, and save Nassun from certain death. They struggle, but neither can gain an upper edge, and Essun gives up to allow her daughter to complete her task, rather than risk Nassun's destruction. She releases control of the Gate and is completely turned to stone. Nassun, moved by the sight, decides to complete her mother's task and use the Gate to return the Moon to orbit.

In the aftermath, the Fifth Seasons are ended and civilization starts to rebuild. In a cave deep underground, Hoa, at the end of The Fifth Season revealed to be the narrator of the series, patiently awaits the rebirth of Essun as a stone eater. She emerges from a geode and expresses her familiar wish to make the world better. Hoa and Essun set off together to do so. It is implied that the entire trilogy is Hoa describing Essun's life to her, as to remind her of her previous life and connect her with her lost self.

Narration 
The Broken Earth series uses several different styles of narration. The most widely remarked upon is its use of second person. It is eventually revealed that the books' narrator is Hoa. In The Stone Sky, Hoa narrates portions of the book set in the past in first person, and portions set in the present in second person (for Essun's perspective) and third person (for Nassun's and Syenite's perspective). Jemisin has stated that she isn't sure what prompted her to try writing Essun's chapters from a second person point-of-view, but that she ultimately chose to keep writing in second person because it conveyed "disassociation of [Essun], the not-all-here of her".

Reception 
The Stone Skys release was anticipated on several "best of" upcoming science fiction and fantasy lists, including The Washington Post and io9, and reception upon its release was laudatory, winning Jemisin a third consecutive Hugo Award for Best Novel. This is an extraordinary achievement, as Jemisin has won the Hugo Award for best novel in three consecutive years.

In starred reviews, Publishers Weekly summed up the novel as having "vivid characters, a tautly constructed plot, and outstanding worldbuilding" that came together in "an impressive and timely story of abused, grieving survivors fighting to fix themselves and save the remnants of their shattered home", and Kirkus Reviews noting that "Jemisin continues to break the heart with her sensitive, cleareyed depictions of a beyond-dysfunctional family and the extraordinarily destructive force that is prejudice." RT Book Reviews gave the book five stars, higher than the first two books in the series. Library Journal did not give The Stone Sky a star, but called it a "powerful conclusion" with a "fully developed world, detailed settings, and complex characters".

NPR's reviewer Amal El-Mohtar praised the novel's twist on traditional fantasy and science-fiction, which usually posits that a world is worth saving. "The Stone Sky rejects this out of hand", El-Mohtar writes. "If the Broken Earth trilogy as a whole shows a world where cataclysm and upheaval is the norm, The Stone Sky interrogates what right worlds built on oppression and genocide have to exist." Tor.com's Niall Alexander, who was critical of The Obelisk Gate, declared that The Stone Sky was a "comprehensive confirmation of N. K. Jemisin as one of our very finest fantasists", and that as a whole, the series is "one of the great trilogies of our time". Barnes & Noble's Joel Cunningham agreed, asserting that it "reshapes the face of epic fantasy", as did The Verges Andrew Liptak, praising the book as "a triumphant achievement in fantasy literature". He concluded:

References

External links 
Barnes & Noble interview
SFF180 review

2017 science fiction novels
2017 American novels
English-language novels
Hugo Award for Best Novel-winning works
Novels by N. K. Jemisin
Orbit Books books